{{DISPLAYTITLE:C22H28Cl2O4}}
The molecular formula C22H28Cl2O4 (molar mass: 427.36 g/mol) may refer to:

 Meclorisone
 Mometasone, or mometasone furoate

Molecular formulas